Santa María del Mar District is a district in southern Lima Province in Peru. It is bordered by the Pacific Ocean on the west, the district of San Bartolo on the north, the Chilca District of the Cañete Province on the east, and the Pucusana District on the south.

It is well known for its beaches and attracts many beachgoers every summer. Many of them also rent apartments during this season, making its population increase considerably. The district has some restaurants and a club with a large seawater swimming pool. The most popular beaches in the district are Santa María (also known as Playa Grande) and Embajadores.

History

The land upon which the district was built was originally known as Curayacu–Poza de Santa María, originally an archeological site with remains dating back to the era of the Incan Empire and before. The site was visited by archeologists , from Switzerland, and Bernardino Ojeda, from Peru, in the 1960s. The remains unearthed in the area were estimated to date back to 4,500 years ago and belonging to hunter-gatherer cultures who fished in the area and dried their food in the desert in order to take it to the Sierra for thousands of years. Also found in the area were ceramics, now in possession of the Centro de Investigaciones de Zonas Áridas (CIZA), and the remains of a rustic temple in the south. These newer findings are alleged to have belonged to the Yschma people, which later merged with the Incas. Supporting these claims was the discovery of a cemetery belonging to said culture during construction work in Embajadores beach. A protected area by the Ministry of Culture now exists known as Sector A.

After the success of the Chilean land campaign in Tacna and Arica during the War of the Pacific, the Chilean Army launched another land campaign in December 1880 in order to take Lima. Once the Chilean troops reached Pisco, General Manuel Baquedano split his troops into two groups: one part headed for Lurín Valley, and the other would continue north toward Lima. The latter reached Curayacu on December 24 of the same year, establishing a campsite in the Santa María area the day after and later leaving for Lurín. This was accomplished due to the Peruvians' lack of knowledge of the area, which the Chileans took advantage of. As a result, over 19,000 soldiers disembarked on Embajadores beach.

In the decades following the war, the area of Santa María—then part of Chilca—became known as the caletita used by the Chileans to reach Lima, being described as such in  1922 Geographic Dictionary of Peru. The name given to the caleta by local fishermen as a result of the association to the 1880 landing, "Caleta de los chilenos" (Caleta of the Chileans), was bastardised into "Caleta de los chilcanos" (Caleta of the Chilca locals).

The area, by now part of San Bartolo District, was the focus of two concessions, with the first one taking place on January 30, 1943, granted by the Ministry of the Navy to Luis Debernardi Dávila for 10 years, concerning what was known as a 25 ha area in Posa de Santa María beach to be used for fish farming.

In 1950, Elías Fernandini brought a pine seed from France and planted it in the entrance of the district (it later died in late 2022). The species (A. excelsa) is native to Norfolk Island and over 400 trees of the same type adorn the district. 8 years later, a Peruvian architect of Austrian descent won a contest to begin the development of a yacht club, which later came to be known as Club Esmeralda. Weberhofer's work was later called by the American National Association of Home Builders as the "Capri of South America".

The area soon became the birthplace of the local jet set culture, with locals from Lima visiting or establishing themselves in the district. International visitors were also attracted, with visitors that included then Prince of Spain, Juan Carlos I.

The district's first mayor was Aurelio Yrigoyen Rodrigo, whose tenure started in 1962. He was succeeded by 5 other mayors up until 2011, and 3 more since then.

In 2020, a bust of Miguel Grau and the nautical chart of Santa María was unveiled in the district. In 2021, a 6 × 1.6 cm Chilean Bachmann-type cartridge dating back to the War of the Pacific was found in Embajadores.

See also 
 Administrative divisions of Peru

References

External links

  Municipality of Santa María del Mar

Districts of Lima